Mera Lahoo (translation:   My Blood) is a 1987 Indian directed by Veerendra and starring Govinda and Kimi Katkar. The film was directed by punjabi actor veerendra an it was declared  hit.

Summary

Elder brother Dharam (Raj Kiran) and younger brother Govinda (Govinda) are living happily in a village. Dharam marries Pavitra (Kimi Katkar) and Govinda falls in love with Gita. Soon after marriage, due to evil thoughts and tactics, the two brothers are separated. Dharam's mind has been poisoned by Dhaneshwar, and he alleged Govinda as having had physical relations with his Bhabhi Pavita, and therefore Govinda leaves the house. In the absence of Govinda, Dharam has been murdered and Bhabhi Pavitra becomes the victim of Dhaneshwar's lust for sex. Govinda returns to avenge his brother's death and Bhabi's rape. How and where Govinda avenges form the climax.

Cast
Govinda - Govinda Singh
Kimi Katkar - Pavitra D. Singh / Geeta
Gulshan Grover - Dhaneshwar "Dhanu"
Utpal Dutt - Pratap Singh 
Raj Kiran - Dharam Singh
Birbal - Raunaki
Kirti Kumar - Rahim
Sunil Dhawan - Senior Police Inspector

Soundtrack

The music composed by Anu Malik.

External links
 

1980s Hindi-language films
1987 films
Films scored by Anu Malik